Pauline Starke (January 10, 1901 – February 3, 1977) was an American silent-film actress.

Early years
Pauline Starke was born on January 10, 1901, in Joplin, Missouri, the daughter of George W. Starke and Edythe Edna Starke (née Bruce). Starke left school after completing the 5th grade. She accompanied her mother to Los Angeles and caught the attention of D. W. Griffith while her mother was working as an extra.

Career
Selected as one of the WAMPAS Baby Stars in 1922, Starke starred in a number of films from 1916 to 1935.

She made her acting debut as an extra in The Birth of a Nation (1915) and appeared as a dance extra in Intolerance (1916). She continued to play bit parts until director Frank Borzage started casting her in leading roles, beginning in 1917. She scored several lead roles in films, establishing her as a prominent silent-film actress during the 1920s.

On Broadway, Starke portrayed Sylvia Clayton in Zombie (1932).

Personal life and death 
Starke married producer/director Jack White on September 4, 1927, and they divorced in 1931. In 1932, she married actor George Sherwood.

Starke died from the aftermath of a stroke on February 3, 1977, in Santa Monica, California.

Recognition 
Starke has a star on the Hollywood Walk of Fame, at 6125 Hollywood Blvd, for her contributions to Motion Pictures.

Selected filmography

Intolerance (1916) - Favorite of the Harem (uncredited)
Puppets (1916, Short) - Columbine
The Rummy (1916) - The Girl
The Wharf Rat (1916) - Flo
Cheerful Givers (1917) - Abigail Deady
 Madame Bo-Peep (1917) - Juanita
The Regenerates (1917) - Nora Duffy
Until They Get Me (1917) - Margy
The Argument (1918) - Wyllis Hyde
The Shoes That Danced (1918) - Rhoda Regan
Innocent's Progress (1918) - Tessa Fayne
The Man Who Woke Up (1918) - Edith Oglesby
 Alias Mary Brown (1918) - Betty
Daughter Angele (1918) - Angele
The Atom (1918) - Jenny
Irish Eyes (1918) - Pegeen O'Barry
Whom the Gods Would Destroy (1919) - Julie
The Life Line (1919) - Ruth Heckett
Eyes of Youth (1919) - Rita Ashling
The Broken Butterfly (1919) - Marcene Elliot
Soldiers of Fortune (1919) - Hope Langham
The Little Shepherd of Kingdom Come (1920, Lost film) - Melissa
Dangerous Days (1920) - Delight Haverford
The Courage of Marge O'Doone (1920, Lost film) - Marge O'Doone
Seeds of Vengeance (1920) - Ellen Daw
The Untamed (1920) - Kate Cumberland
A Connecticut Yankee in King Arthur's Court (1921, Incomplete, only reels 2, 4, and 7 exist) - Sandy
Snowblind (1921) - The Girl
Salvation Nell (1921) - Nell Sanders
The Forgotten Woman (1921) - Dixie LaRose
Wife Against Wife (1921) - Gabrielle Gautier
Flower of the North (1921) - Jeanne D'Arcambal
My Wild Irish Rose (1922, Lost film) - Moya
If You Believe It, It's So (1922, Lost film) - Alvah Morley
The Kingdom Within (1922) - Emily Preston
Lost and Found on a South Sea Island (1923) - Lorna
Little Church Around the Corner (1923) - Hetty Burrows
 The Little Girl Next Door (1923) - Mary Slocum
His Last Race (1923) - Denny's Wife
In the Palace of the King (1923) - Inez Mendoza
Eyes of the Forest (1923) - Ruth Melier
Arizona Express (1924) - Katherine Keith
 Missing Daughters (1924) - Pauine Hinton
Dante's Inferno (1924) - The Nurse - Marjorie Vernon
Hearts of Oak (1924, Lost film) - Chrystal
Forbidden Paradise (1924) - Anna
Adventure (1925, Lost film) - Joan Lackland
The Devil's Cargo (1925) - Far Sampson
The Man Without a Country (1925) - Anne Bissell
Sun-Up (1925) - Emmy
Bright Lights (1925, Lost, only the trailer exists) - Patsy Delaney
War Paint (1926, Lost, only the trailer exists) - Polly Hopkins
Love's Blindness (1926, Lost, only a fragment exists) - Vanessa Levy
Camille (1926, Short) - Nan
Honesty – The Best Policy (1926) - Mary Kay
Captain Salvation (1927) - Bess Morgan
Dance Magic  (1927) - Johala Chandler
Streets of Shanghai (1927) - Mary Sanger
The Perfect Sap (1927) as Polly Stoddard
The Viking (1928) - Helga Nilsson
Man, Woman and Wife (1929) - Julia / Rita
The Mysterious Island (1929)
A Royal Romance (1930) - Countess von Baden
What Men Want (1930) - Lee Joyce
$20 a Week (1935) - Sally Blair
She Knew All the Answers (1941) - Prim Woman (uncredited)
Lost Angel (1943) - Bobby's Mother (uncredited) (final film role)

Notes

References

External links

 
 
 
 Pauline Starke at Virtual History

1901 births
1977 deaths
People from Joplin, Missouri
American film actresses
American silent film actresses
20th-century American actresses
WAMPAS Baby Stars